Demopsestis is a genus of moths belonging to the subfamily Thyatirinae.

Species
Demopsestis formosana Yoshimoto, 1983
Demopsestis mahendrai Yoshimoto, 1993
Demopsestis punctigera (Butler, 1885)
Demopsestis yoshimotoi Laszlo, G.Ronkay, L.Ronkay & Witt, 2007

References

 , 1927, Journal of the College of Agriculture, Hokkaido Imperial University of Tokyo 19: 16.
 , 2007, Esperiana Buchreihe zur Entomologie Band 13: 1-683 

Thyatirinae
Drepanidae genera